Peggy Thorpe-Bates (11 August 1914 – 26 December 1989) was an English actress who appeared in the first three series of Rumpole of the Bailey as Rumpole's fearsome wife Hilda. She also appeared in numerous other supporting roles on both stage and screen.

She attended Heathfield School, the Cone School of Dancing and RADA, then appeared in repertory theatre in Birmingham, Bristol, Harrogate and with the BBC Repertory Company. Her film appearances included Georgy Girl and Mosquito Squadron. On television she had recurring roles in Timeslip and Return of the Saint. She also guest starred in Mrs Thursday, Tales of the Unexpected, and The Young Ones.

She was married to fellow actor Brian Oulton, with whom she had a son and a daughter, the actress Jenny Oulton.

Partial filmography

Notes

Further reading 

 "Peggy Thorpe-Bates", The Times (London), 2 January 1990, p. 12.

External links

1914 births
1989 deaths
English radio actresses
English stage actresses
English television actresses
Actresses from London
20th-century British actresses
Alumni of RADA
20th-century English women
20th-century English people